6α-Methylprogesterone (6α-MP) is a progestin which was never marketed. It has 150% of the progestogenic potency of progesterone. In addition, and in contrast to progesterone, 6α-MP has weak androgenic, antiandrogenic, and synandrogenic actions. 6α-MP is structurally related to medroxyprogesterone acetate (MPA; 6α-methyl-17α-acetoxyprogesterone) and megestrol acetate (MGA; 6-dehydro-6-methyl-17α-acetoxyprogesterone), which possess androgenic and/or antiandrogenic activity to varying degrees similarly. MPA is more androgenic than 6α-MP and MGA.

References

Abandoned drugs
Androgens and anabolic steroids
Diketones
Pregnanes
Progestogens